GameDay Center was a planned 15-story residential condominium at the corner of Broadway and West High Street in Lexington, Kentucky. The 188-unit project was planned by Gameday Centers LLC who had hoped to construct the tower to give University of Kentucky basketball fans a residence near Rupp Arena. Retail stores would have occupied the first floor, with a sports-themed restaurant on the second. Parking would have been located in an underground three-story garage.

The concept, according to Gameday Centers, would have been patterned from similar projects in Auburn, Alabama, Knoxville, Tennessee, Tallahassee, Florida and Athens, Georgia. The Gameday Center lot contained a vacant lot with a historic structure and a small one-story office flat. The historic building, constructed in 1808, would have been preserved as a fitness center and conference facility; the one-story office building would have been demolished. Construction would have begun in spring 2005 as the  corner lot was adequately zoned, however, the architectural review board had concerns that the height of the building would overshadow the nearby residents in the South Hill district.

On February 15, 2005, the Gameday Center was shortened from 15 to seven-stories due to worries from South Hill residents that the residential tower would have "dwarfed" nearby two and three-story rowhouses and townhomes. This plan received welcome support from most adjacent residents.

It was later revised in June to ten stories with 126 units. The proposed project now contained . of first-floor retail, with 180 parking spaces spaced between the first and third floors with seven-stories of residential condos above. It was rejected on June 21  because the city of Lexington's historic preservation staff disapproved of the project because it failed to meet any of the "design criteria for a structure in a historic district" and was once again too tall for its surroundings. It was considered "overkill" instead of "infill."

More than 50 people had made their initial deposit towards their condo. However, their deposits were returned and all projects regarding Gameday are on indefinite hold.

References

See also
 Cityscape of Lexington, Kentucky

Residential buildings in Lexington, Kentucky